Martin Ruppel (born 5 November 1966) is a German former rowing coxswain. He competed in the men's coxed four event at the 1988 Summer Olympics.

References

External links
 

1966 births
Living people
German male rowers
Olympic rowers of West Germany
Rowers at the 1988 Summer Olympics
People from Osterode am Harz
Sportspeople from Lower Saxony